Paul Fitzgerald (born October 14, 1970) is an American actor, director and writer. Fitzgerald is best known for directing, writing and starring in the film Forgiven and for his roles in the films The Secret Life of Walter Mitty, Teenage Mutant Ninja Turtles and Arbitrage. Fitzgerald is also known for his appearances in the television series Younger, Veep, Treme and Guiding Light, and for playing Garry LeJeune in the Broadway production Noises Off.

Early life 
Born in New York City, New York, and raised in Lynchburg, Virginia, Fitzgerald graduated from Northwestern University in 1993 and obtained his Master's degree at the Old Globe/University of San Diego Drama School.

Career

Film 
Fitzgerald and his producing partner, Kelly Miller, formed their company, Pulled Pictures, in 2004 to produce Paul's directorial debut feature, Forgiven. Fitzgerald also wrote and starred in Forgiven, which won the Jury Prize for Best Male Actor (Hornsby), Best Supporting Actress (Grant) and Best Screenplay (Fitzgerald) at the BendFilm Festival, and was nominated for the Grand Jury Prize at the Sundance Film Festival. Fitzgerald is also known for his roles in Arbitage, The Secret Life of Walter Mitty, Teenage Mutant Ninja Turtles, Helena from the Wedding, Crazy like a Fox and Jackie Goldberg Private Dick.

Television 
Fitzgerald is known for his roles in the television series Younger, Veep, Deadbeat, Treme, Guiding Light, The Bedford Diaries, Opposite Sex and M.Y.O.B. He has also appeared in series such as The Good Wife, Golden Boy, The Americans, Royal Pains, The Mentalist, Law and Order, The West Wing, Boardwalk Empire, Blue Bloods, Lights Out, Fringe and John Adams.

Theatre 
Fitzgerald has appeared in the Broadway production Noises Off as Garry LeJeune, and the downtown rock musical Debbie Does Dallas.

Personal life 
Fitzgerald was a member of the 1988 E.C. Glass High School football team that won the Virginia 3A State Championship. He is the nephew of progressive talk radio personality Stephanie Miller and grandson of William E. Miller, who ran as vice-president with Barry Goldwater in 1964 presidential election, against Lyndon Johnson and Hubert Humphrey.

In 2011, he joined the "I am Visible" campaign and appeared on the cover of Bi-Social magazine where he proclaimed his bisexuality. He has appeared as bisexual characters in his work, such as Law & Order: Special Victims Unit and Will & Grace. As of 2017, Fitzgerald lives in New York City.

References

External links
 

1970 births
20th-century American male actors
21st-century American male actors
Male actors from New York City
American male film actors
American male screenwriters
American male stage actors
American male television actors
Bisexual male actors
Film directors from New York City
LGBT people from Virginia
Living people
Northwestern University alumni
People from Lynchburg, Virginia
University of San Diego alumni
Film directors from Virginia
Screenwriters from New York (state)
Screenwriters from Virginia
American bisexual actors